The 2014–15 Premier League was a professional association football league season in England.

2014–15 Premier League may also refer to:

Association football
 2014–15 Armenian Premier League
 2014–15 Azerbaijan Premier League
 2014–15 Premier League of Belize
 2014–15 Premier League of Bosnia and Herzegovina
 2014–15 Egyptian Premier League
 2014–15 Hong Kong Premier League
 2014–15 Israeli Premier League
 2014–15 Kuwaiti Premier League
 2014–15 Lebanese Premier League
 2014–15 Maltese Premier League
 2014–15 National Premier League (Jamaica)
 2014–15 Premier Soccer League (South Africa)
 2014–15 Russian Premier League
 2014–15 Syrian Premier League
 2014–15 Tanzanian Premier League
 2014–15 Ukrainian Premier League
 2014–15 Welsh Premier League

Basketball
 2014–15 Irish Premier League season